Jason Hughes (born 18 December 1971) is a Welsh actor best known for playing Sergeant Ben Jones in the ITV series Midsomer Murders (2005–2013) and for the BBC drama This Life (1996–1997) in which he played lawyer Warren Jones. Hughes has also appeared in theatre such as the 1999 re-enactment of Our Country's Good as the Second Lieutenant Ralph Clark.

Background 
Hughes was born in Porthcawl and spent most of his early childhood there with his family. He is of Italian and Welsh descent. His grandfather, Raldo Carpinini, was the son of an Italian immigrant from  Bardi, Emilia-Romagna who came and settled into Ammanford. Hughes' great-grandfather was originally trained to lay train tracks but eventually began an ice-cream business. Hughes' maternal grandfather became a policeman in Porthcawl.

Hughes planned to become a sportsman in either rugby or cricket as a teenager but he had to become a lot bigger and lacked the support to become a first class rugby player. When Hughes was 11 or 12 in attended a comprehensive school, he had a teacher who inspired him in his drama classes and encouraged him to apply for the National Youth Theatre of Wales.

His biggest inspirations growing up were Welsh actor Anthony Hopkins. Hughes studied drama at in the National Youth Theatre of Wales where he met Michael Sheen in the summer of 1987, when he was 16. Hughes and Sheen lived in the same halls of residence where they became close friends. They were both atypical to acting, coming from a sports background and liked music; Hughes had learnt guitar and piano earlier. He also met actors Ruth Jones, Rob Brydon and Hywel Simons; Simons was a School friend of Sheen's.

Hughes later went on to study drama at the London Academy of Music and Dramatic Art and moved in with Sheen and Hywel Simons. Hughes went on to play in the 1999 production of Look Back in Anger with Sheen at the National Youth Theatre and Caligula at the Donmar.

Career 
Hughes' first big role was lawyer Warren Jones in This Life which aired from 1996–1997. It revolves around a group of posh, badly behaved, young lawyers who end up emotionally detached from each other usually due to sex. It was the UK's hottest drama show of the 1990s and the show won five awards including the Royal Television Society's award for best drama. Hughes's character had an impact on the gay community since his character is portrayed as homosexual, causing young gay men to write letters to Hughes about their stories of coming out to their families.

In 2005, Hughes began starring in the murder mystery television series Midsomer Murders as Detective Sergeant Ben Jones. The show revolves around two detectives who solve gory and unique murders amongst the tranquil setting of Midsomer County. Hughes was originally told to speak in an English accent as his Welsh accent did not fit the character criteria. Hughes was aware of the show's repertoire after watching a few episodes and he knew the standards the directors were looking for. In the years prior to the role,  Hughes had had a second child and was shooting a film in Ireland where all his income went into paying bills. After feeling "irresponsible" and "letting myself, wife and children down" Hughes was reluctant when his agent spoke to him about an interview for Midsomer Murders which gave him 10 months a year of work; he described it as a "gift from the angels". After 2 years in this role, Hughes had a steady pay cheque, which caused him to sign-up for another 2 years, then another three. His 7 years of acting in Midsomer influenced Hughes's acting by learning technical language and getting used to the lines and formats of scripts. In 2013, he left Midsomer Murders but returned for one episode of Series 19 in 2017. After leaving Midsomer Murders, he briefly moved to Hollywood, but soon decided to return to the United Kingdom.

In 1999, Hughes played Ralph Clark in Our Country's Good. Clark is the second lieutenant who is ordered to gather a group of negative and demoralised convicts into a cast that is able to re-enact Farquhar's The Performing Officer. He played Cliff in a
1999 production of Look Back in Anger.

The 2015 play, Violence and Son, by Gary Owen is about a Welsh 17-year-old boy whose mother recently passed away from cancer. He is forced to live with his biological father, Rick (Jason Hughes). The plot thickens when he meets Jen, a girl he meets in college who shares a passion for Doctor Who with  him. However, she already has a boyfriend, a rugby player called Jorden.

Hughes played in a band, Butterfly Macqueen, playing guitar and singing backup vocals. The band last performed in Brighton on 12 February 2009 at the opening of the American Music Club.

Personal life 
Hughes is a father of three children; Molly, Max and Carys. He is married to jewellery designer Natasha Dahlberg, formerly an actress. Hughes calls himself a family man and part of what caused him to leave Midsomer Murders was due to being away from home for up to six months. When he is not acting or spending time with his wife and children, Hughes goes swimming and does yoga.

Filmography

Film 
House! (2000)
Phoenix Blue (2001)
Shooters (2002)
Tarot Mechanic (2002)
Killing Me Softly (2002)
Sorry (2004)
Feeder (2005)
Red Mercury (2005)
Dead Long Enough (2006)

Television 
London's Burning (1994)
The Bill (1995)
Peak Practice (1995)
Castles (1995)
Casualty (1996)
King Girl (1996)
This Life (1996–97, 2007)
Strangers in the Night (1995)
Harry Enfield and Chums (1997)
The Flint Street Nativity (1999)
Plain Jane (2002)
Waking the Dead (2003)
Mine All Mine (2004)
Dead Long Enough (2005)
Midsomer Murders (2005–2013, 2017)
Death In Paradise (2017)
Three Girls (2017)
Marcella, Series 2 (2018)
The Pact (2021)

Theatre 
A Slice of Saturday Night (1992, Theater Auf Tournee, Germany — tour)
Macbeth (1994, Theatre Clwyd)
The Unexpected Guest (1994, Theatre Royal, Windsor)
Nothing to Pay (1995, Thin Language)
Phaedra's Love (1996, Royal Court Theatre — staged opreading)
Badfinger (1997, Donmar Warehouse)
The Illusion (1997, Royal Exchange, Manchester)
Snake in the Grass (1997, The Old Vic)
The Herbal Bed (1998, Royal Shakespeare Company)
A Real Classy Affair (1998, Royal Court Theatre)
Violence and Son (Royal Court Theatre Upstairs).
Look Back in Anger (1999, Lyttelton Theatre)
In Flame (2000, New Ambassador's Theatre)
Kiss Me Like You Mean It (2001, Soho Theatre)
A Wing and a Prayer (2002, Battersea Arts Centre Studio)
Fight for Barbara (2003, Theatre Royal, BathTheatre Royal, Bath)
Design for Living (2003, Theatre Royal, Bath)
Caligula (2003, Donmar Warehouse)
4.48 Psychosis (2004, Royal Court Theatre and US tour)
In the Next Room (or The Vibrator Play) (2013, St. James)
Our Country's Good (2015, Olivier Theatre)
The Goat, or Who Is Sylvia? (2017, Theatre Royal Haymarket)
On Bear Ridge (2019, The Royal Court Theatre, London)

Radio 
Green Baize Dream (1995)
Cadfael: "Dead Man's Ransom" (1995)
A Clockwork Orange (1998)
Cold Calling (2003)
Time for Mrs. Milliner (2003)
Bubble (2004)
The Guest Before You (2004)
School Runs (2006)
Inspector Steine (2007)
Gite a la Mer (2007)
The Pale Horse (2017)

Audio books 
Framed (2006)

References

External links 

Welsh male television actors
Living people
People from Porthcawl
National Youth Theatre members
1971 births